The College General is a Roman Catholic interdiocesan seminary located in Tanjung Bungah, Penang, Malaysia. The college's foundation can be traced back to the 1665 establishment of the Seminary of Saint Joseph in Ayuthia which was then the capital of Siam (now Thailand).

History

Ayuthia (1665–1765)

The College General traces its history to the establishment of the Seminary of Saint Joseph in Ayuthia, Siam, in 1665 by the Vicars Apostolic Bishops Pallu and Lambert de la Motte of the Paris Foreign Missions Society. They officially requested the establishment of the seminary to the Siamese king Narai on 25 May 1665, who granted them a large spot on the river Menam, and the Cochinchinese quarter named "Banplahet". King Narai requested that ten Siamese students be incorporated in the seminary so as to learn European knowledge. Otherwise, the students of the seminary came from Goa, Macao, Cochinchina, Tonkin and China. In 1675, Mgr Louis Laneau, who had been nominated Vicar Apostolic of Siam two years before, became Superior of the Seminary.

Among the first two priests that graduated was François Pérez (Francis Perez), born of a Manila father and a Siamese mother, who was later consecrated a bishop and named Vicar Apostolic of Cochin-China in 1691.

In 1680, the seminary was moved to a larger location in Mahapram, also near Ayutthaya, and was named Seminary of the Holy Angels.

The events of the Siamese revolution in 1688 saw the ousting of French forces from Siam, and the imprisonment of Louis Laneau and half of the students of the Seminary until August 1690, but the activities of the Seminary could resume from 1691.

Chanthaburi, Hon Dat, Pondicherry & Melaka (1765–1782)
The Burmese invasion of Ayuthia in 1765 forced the relocation of the seminary to Chanthaburi and later to Hon Dat in Cambodia (now in Vietnam). Pigneau de Behaine, who was to have a great destiny in Vietnam, was put in charge of the seminary.<ref name="'Les Missions Etrangères, p.329">'Les Missions Etrangères, p.329</ref>

The political instability of that period resulted in the seminarians to live in poverty and although a new building was built, it was razed to the ground by rebels. The deteriorating political situation and constant persecutions forced the search for a more tranquil location for the seminary.

India was chosen and in 1770, 2 professors and 41 seminarians arrived at Pondicherry, India, by sea after stopping for two months in Melaka. The seminary was established at Virampatnam.

Despite its peaceful calm, Pondicherry proved unsuitable as it was too far from China and Indo-China where most of the seminarians came from. As a result, the seminary was temporary closed in 1782 until a more suitable place could be found.

Pulau Tikus, Penang (1808–1914)

The island of Penang, a British colony since its occupation by Francis Light in 1786 was eventually chosen due to its political stability and geographical proximity to the other mission lands. In 1808, a new Superior, Fr. Lolivier arrived with five seminarians from Macau and the seminary was revived with its current name the following year in Pulau Tikus, Penang, with 20 seminarians from China. The college had prominent members take on the role as teaching staff, including Laurent-Marie-Joseph Imbert and Jacques-Honoré Chastan, who served from 1821 to 1822 and 1827 to 1830, respectively. Both were martyred in Korea and later beatified in 1925 by Pope Pius XI. Both were canonised in 1984 by Pope John Paul II. The college also was a sanctuary for the vicar general of Annam and scores of seminarians during the persecutions of 1834–35 and among the number included Philip Minh Van Doan who was martyred and later canonised in 1988.

In 1885, the buildings were expanded to cope with the additional seminarians that came to Penang due to persecution in other territories in the region. With peace returning, enrollment was reduced with a large majority of the seminarians coming from the newly established missions in Rangoon and Mandalay in Burma.

Pulau Tikus, Penang (1914–present)
At present, the College General is owned and managed by three dioceses: the Roman Catholic Archdiocese of Kuala Lumpur, Roman Catholic Diocese of Penang, and Roman Catholic Diocese of Malacca-Johor.

 People 

 Rectors of the College General 

This is a list of rectors who have served the College General since it was revived in Penang in 1808.

Saints
Many of the college faculty and alumni were martyred over the years and some have eventually been canonised:College General List of Martyrs of College General 

Notable alumni
The college has produced many notable alumni both in the religious and secular vocations:College General: Treasuring the Past 

Saints and martyrs
 2 canonised professors martyred in Korea (see above)
 5 canonised seminarians martyred in Vietnam (see above)
 50 beatified Vietnamese Martyrs

Archbishops

 John Joseph U Win
 Auxiliary Bishop of Mandalay, Burma (1954–1959); Archbishop of Mandalay, Burma (1959–1965)
 Dominic Vendargon
 Bishop of Kuala Lumpur, Malaysia (1955–1972); Archbishop of Kuala Lumpur, Malaysia (1972–1983)
 Gabriel Thohey Mahn-Gaby
 Coadjutor Archbishop of Rangoon, Burma (1964–1971); Titular Archbishop of Staurapolis, Asia Minor (1964–1971); Archbishop of Rangoon, Burma (1971–2002)
 Aloysius Moses U Ba Khim
 Archbishop of Mandalay, Burma (1965–1978)
 Gregory Yong Sooi Ngean
 Bishop of Penang, Malaysia (1968–1977); Archbishop of Singapore, Singapore (1977–2000)
 Anthony Soter Fernandez
 Bishop of Penang, Malaysia (1977–1983); Archbishop of Kuala Lumpur, Malaysia (1983–2003)
 Lawrence Khai Saen-Phon-On
 Archbishop of Thare and Nonseng, Thailand (1980–2004)
 John Lee Hiong Fun-Yit Yaw
 Bishop of Kota Kinabalu, Malaysia (1987–2008), Archbishop of Kota Kinabalu, Malaysia (2008–2012)
 Murphy Nicholas Xavier Pakiam
 Auxiliary Bishop of Kuala Lumpur, Malaysia (1995–2003); Titular Bishop of Chunavia, Epirus Nova (1995–2003); Archbishop of Kuala Lumpur (2003–2013)
 Julian Leow Beng Kim
 Archbishop of Kuala Lumpur (2014–present)

Bishops
 Jean Baptiste Tran-Huu-Duc
 Vicar Apostolic of Vinh, Vietnam (1951–1960); Bishop of Vinh, Vietnam (1960–1971)
 George Maung Kyaw
 Bishop of Bassein, Burma (1955–1968)
 Francis Chan
 Bishop of Penang, Malaysia (1955–1967)
 Sebastian U Shwe Yauk
 Bishop of Toungoo, Burma (1961–1988)
 Paul Nguyen-Dình Nhien
 Coadjutor Bishop of Vinh, Vietnam (1963–1969); Titular Bishop of Gisipa, Carthage (1963–1969)
 Joseph Mahn Erie
 Bishop of Bassein, Burma (1968–1982)
 Abraham Than
 Auxiliary Bishop of Kengtung, Burma (1968–1972); Titular Bishop of Tortibulum, Italy (1968–1972); Bishop of Kengtung, Burma (1972–2001)
 Lawrence Thienchai Samanchit
 Bishop of Chanthaburi, Thailand (1971–present)
 James Chan Soon Cheong
 Bishop of Malacca-Johore, Malaysia (1973–2001)
 Joseph Devellerez Thaung Shwe
 Bishop of Prome, Burma (1975–present)
 Simon Michael Fung Kui Heong
 Vicar Apostolic of Kota Kinabalu, Malaysia (1975–1976); Titular Bishop of Catabum Castra, Mauretania Caesariensis (1975–1976); Bishop of Kota Kinabalu, Malaysia (1976–1985)
 Anthony Lee Kok Hin
 Bishop of Miri, Malaysia (1977–2013)
 Anthony Selvanayagam
 Auxiliary Bishop of Kuala Lumpur, Malaysia (1980–1983), Titular Bishop of Giru Mons, Mauretania Caesariensis (1980–1983), Bishop of Penang (1983–present)
 Dominic Su Haw Chiu
 Bishop of Sibu, Malaysia (1986–2011)
 Cornelius Piong
 Bishop of Keningau, Malaysia (1992–present)

Notes

ReferencesLes Missions Etrangères. Trois siecles et demi d'histoire et d'aventure en Asie'' Editions Perrin, 2008,

External links
 College General Website (1)
 College General Website (2)

George Town, Penang
Seminaries and theological colleges in Malaysia
Catholic Church in Malaysia
Catholic seminaries
1665 establishments in Asia